Andrea Štaka is a Swiss film director best known for winning the Golden Leopard at the 59th Locarno International Film Festival in 2006 for her film, Das Fräulein.

Štaka was born in Lucerne in 1973. She attended the film and video department of the Hochschule für Gestaltung und Kunst Zürich. She lives in Zürich and New York.

Filmography 
 Cure - Život druge (Cure - The Life of Another), 2014, drama, 83 min.
 Das Fräulein, 2006, motion picture, 81min., 35mm. Golden Leopard, 2006 Locarno International Film Festival.
 Yugodivas, 2000, documentary, 60 min., 35mm. Quality Award, Swiss Federal Office of Culture.
 Hotel Belgrad, 1998, drama, 13 min., 35mm. Various awards including Best Director, Brooklyn International Film Festival, New York; Feature Award, Seh-Süchte Festival, Berlin; Grand Prix du Jury, Rencontres Internationales Henri Langlois, Poitiers.
 several video clips, 1992–1999

References

External links 
 Biography at dschointventschr.ch
 Biography at swissfilms.ch
 Video interview on the making of Das Fräulein
 DVD DAS FRÄULEIN
 
 Andrea Staka at the Swiss Film Directory

Swiss film directors
Swiss women film directors
Swiss screenwriters
German-language film directors
Living people
Zurich University of the Arts alumni
Year of birth missing (living people)